The Yaren Constituency is one of the constituencies of Nauru. It returns two members from Yaren to the Parliament of Nauru in Yaren, and also is the de facto capital of Nauru.

Members of Parliament

Election results

References

External links

Constituencies of Nauru
Constituency